Total Contrast were a male musical duo from England, specialising in soul and electro music. They are well known for their 1985 hit "Takes a Little Time", which made No. 1 on the US dance chart and No. 17 in the UK. The group formed in 1983 consisting of members Robin Achampong and Delroy Murray.

Biography
In the mid-1980s, they scored several hits on the US Hot Dance Music/Club Play chart, including "Takes a Little Time", which hit No. 1 in 1985. In their homeland, the same song reached No. 17 on the UK Singles Chart. Further releases in the UK included "Hit and Run", a minor hit which reached No. 41 in 1985, "The River" which peaked at No. 44 in early 1986, and "What You Gonna Do About It" peaking at No. 63 in the summer of 1986. The latter track was also featured on the band's self-titled album.

They appeared on the Dance Aid single, released in April 1987. Another album, Beat to Beat, was released in 1987. Two singles, "Kiss" and "Jody", despite being popular on the dance floors, were only minor chart hits. The same happened to their 1988 cover version of Bob Marley's "Waiting in Vain".

Achampong and Murray formed the group Tongue 'n' Cheek in 1987.

Total Contrast found popularity with 1980s revivalists, in particular the Canadian duo Chromeo, who included "Takes a Little Time" on their 2005 album, Chromeo Presents Un Joli Mix Pour Toi.

Discography

Albums

Singles

See also
List of number-one dance hits (United States)
List of artists who reached number one on the US Dance chart

References

External links
Total Contrast Discography at Discogs
Total Contrast on SoundCloud
Official website

British soul musical groups
English funk musical groups
English electro musicians
English musical duos
Male musical duos
London Records artists
Virgin Records artists